Clay Calvert is Professor Emeritus, Brechner Eminent Scholar of Mass Communication Emeritus and former Director of the Marion B. Brechner First Amendment Project in the University of Florida College of Journalism and Communications, specializing in First Amendment Law. He was previously a professor at the Pennsylvania State University where he co-directed the Pennsylvania Center for the First Amendment. A member of the California State Bar Association, he has authored or co-authored more than 150 scholarly articles for law journals. He has also written several books dealing with the First Amendment, the most noteworthy being Voyeur Nation (Westview, 2000).

Other faculty positions
Professor, Fredric G. Levin College of Law (2020 - 2022)
Visiting Professor, McGeorge School of Law, University of the Pacific (Spring 2011)
Interim Dean, Schreyer Honors College (2005–2006)
Associate Dean, Schreyer Honors College (2002–2003)

Education
University of the Pacific, J.D.
Stanford University, Ph.D, Communication
Stanford University, B.A., Communication

Sources
Dr. Calvert's Faculty Page at the University of Florida College of Journalism and Communications

American legal writers
Living people
Place of birth missing (living people)
University of Florida faculty
Year of birth missing (living people)